Funk It! is the second album by American comedian Martin Lawrence, released in 1995. Being only a moderate success, it went on to only making it to #35 on the Top R&B/Hip-Hop Albums.

Track listing
"Open With Rev. Ford"- 4:14 
"Doin' Time in Hollywood"- 3:40 
"Door to Door Comic"- :28 
"Wash Yo' Ass"- 1:12 
"Executive Pussy"- 3:31 
"Had One Girl..."- 10:44 
"Bobbitt"- 12:24 
"Jesus' Chicken"- :55 
"The Friendly Skies"- 3:40 
"Everybody's Gangsta"- 3:42 
"70's Heckle"- 1:18 
"Weekend Wash"- :58 
"Cops"- 2:30 
"The Dog"- 3:10 
"Frontin' on the Cellular"- 1:56 
"Suicide"- 5:11

Martin Lawrence albums
1995 live albums
East West Records live albums
1990s comedy albums
Live comedy albums
Spoken word albums by American artists
Stand-up comedy albums